Skanda was a famed  Brahmin general serving under the Chauhan dynasty of Ajmer. He took part in the successful First Battle of Tarain but according to the Viruddha Vidhi Vidhvansa and other sources, he could not participate in the Second Battle of Tarain due to some uncertain reasons.

Early life
Skanda was born into a prestigious Nagar Brahmin family of kashyapa gotra he was in a designated position of commander-in-chief in the Chahamana court. His ancestors were advisors to the Chauhan kings, his father Sodha was the advisor to king Someshvara and was succeeded by his son Vamana to the post. Skanda was his younger son who was appointed as the Senadhipati.

Military career
Skanda was a famous brahmin general serving under Prithviraj Chauhan, the powerful king of Ajmer. He participated in many of the king's campaigns with success. He materially contributed to the Rajput army in the First Battle of Tarain and took part in it himself, bringing success. 
Between the years of 1182-1187, the Ghurid kingdom launched raids on the northern territories of the Chahamanas. There must have been some engagements of a large scale as Skanda is also mentioned to have repeatedly defeated these incursions.
Lakshmidhar, the author of the Viruddha Vidhi Vidhvansa, was a descendant of Skanda a few generations away from him. The text states that he was engaged in another campaign at the time (specifics of which are not given) and was unable to take part in the Second Battle of Tarain. However, Lakshmidhar was naturally biased towards his ancestor's master Prithviraj Chauhan and keeping that in mind, the real reason for Skanda not participating in the battle is unclear.

Hariraja, the dissatisfied brother of the deceased Prithviraj Chauhan, attacked and managed to recapture Ajmer, and became the new Chahamana king, with support from Prithviraja's former general Skanda.

References

Chahamanas of Shakambhari
Indian generals
Brahmins
12th-century Indian people